James J. Couzens (August 26, 1872October 22, 1936) was an American businessman, politician and philanthropist. He served as mayor of Detroit (1919–1922) and U.S. Senator from Michigan (1922–1936). Prior to entering politics he served as vice president and general manager of the Ford Motor Company.

Early life and career
Couzens was born in Chatham, Ontario, Canada in 1872, the son of soapmaker James and Emma Clift Couzens. He attended the public schools of Chatham and spent time at a business college. He moved to Detroit, Michigan in 1890 and worked as a railroad car checker for the New York Central Railroad from 1890 to 1897. Couzens' diligence at the railroad was noticed by Alexander Y. Malcomson, who hired the young man as a clerk in his coal business. Couzens worked for Malcomson from 1897 to 1903.

In 1898, Couzens married Margaret Manning. The couple had six children: a son born in 1899 who died in infancy; Homer Couzens, born in 1900; Frank Couzens (later mayor of Detroit), born in 1902; Madeline, born in 1904; Margo, born in 1910, and Edith, born in 1911.

Association with Henry Ford
In 1902, Henry Ford was organizing the Ford Motor Company; Alexander Malcomson was a major stakeholder in the company. The two were seeking additional stockholders; Couzens borrowed heavily and invested $2,500 in the new firm. Ford Motor Company was founded in 1903 with John S. Gray as president, Ford as vice-president, Malcomson as treasurer, and Couzens as secretary. Couzens took over the business management of the new firm for an annual salary of $2,400. In 1906, Gray died and Malcomson was eased out of the business, and Couzens became vice president and general manager of the company. The company made both Ford and Couzens wealthy, due in no small part to Couzens's business acumen. However, the two men gradually grew apart, and in 1915 Couzens resigned his position as general manager, although he retained a seat on the board. In 1919, Ford purchased Couzens's shares in the company for $30,000,000.

He was inducted into the Automotive Hall of Fame in 2012.

Detroit work and political career
James Couzens was president of the Bank of Detroit and director of the Detroit Trust Company. He was commissioner of street railways 1913-1915 and commissioner of the metropolitan police department 1916–1918. He was mayor of Detroit 1919–1922. As mayor, Couzens installed municipal street railways.

Senatorial career

Couzens was appointed November 29, 1922, as a Republican to the United States Senate to fill the vacancy caused by the resignation of Truman H. Newberry. This appointment was confirmed by his election on November 4, 1924, at which time he was also elected to a full term commencing March 4, 1925. He was reelected in 1930, serving in total from November 29, 1922, until his death on October 22, 1936. He was an unsuccessful candidate for renomination in 1936, the loss generally attributed to Couzens’s support for Roosevelt's New Deal programs. He was chairman of the U.S. Senate Committee on Civil Service in the Sixty-ninth Congress, the U.S. Senate Committee on Education and Labor in the Sixty-ninth and Seventieth Congresses, the U.S. Senate Committee on Interstate Commerce in the Seventy-first and Seventy-second Congresses. Couzens' actions in Congress generally followed those of the Progressive Republicans, advocating acts such as high graduated income tax and public ownership of utilities.

Couzens died in Detroit and is interred in Woodlawn Cemetery there.

Philanthropy
Couzens established the Children's Fund of Michigan with a $10,000,000 grant. He also gave $1,000,000 for relief in Detroit and began a fund to make loans to the physically handicapped. Under Dr Frank Norton, Dr Kenneth Richard Gibson and their secretary, Kathryn Hutchison, the Children's Fund, among other things, provided free health and dental work for indigent Detroit children. The Fund was set up with a 25-year life span, and the project ended in the mid-1950s. 

In response to the Bath School Disaster, in which Andrew Kehoe, an embittered school board member and treasurer, killed 38 children by blowing up explosives he had planted in the basement of the Bath Consolidated School in Bath Township, Michigan, Couzens gave $75,000 to fund rebuilding. The new school was dedicated as the "James Couzens Agricultural School". He donated $600,000 to the University of Michigan for the building of a residence hall for female nursing students; it was named Couzens Hall in his honor.

In the 1930s, Couzens donated $1 million to Children's Hospital of Michigan, in response to a birthday request from his wife for "a simple box in which to keep my pearls". Couzens complied, including a note within the box describing the $1 million gift, stating "My dear, your new pearls will be all the children who are eventually treated there". Today, Children's Hospital of Michigan is part of the Detroit Medical Center.

Disturbed by the failures of low-income housing projects that came out of the depression, he funded an alternative. He contributed $550,000 of his own personal money, combined with $300,000 from Oakland Housing, to create a managed low-income housing project called Westacres, in West Bloomfield, Michigan. The project gave the low-income factory working man a chance to own a home. The homes were located on 1 acre of land and the owners were required to farm the land to provide food for their families when seasonal layoffs took place.

Miscellaneous
Asked how to say his name, he told The Literary Digest: "Pronounced exactly as cousins."

The middle section of the Lodge Freeway in Detroit was originally named for him. After the entire freeway was renamed to The Lodge, only the service drive retains the Couzens name.

See also
 List of United States Congress members who died in office (1900–49)
 List of United States senators born outside the United States

References

Bibliography
American National Biography
Dictionary of American Biography
Barnard, Harry. Independent Man: The Life of James Couzens, New York, Charles Scribner's Sons, 1958. Republished by Detroit: Wayne State University Press, 2002. 
U.S. Congress. Memorial Services Held in the House of Representatives of the United States, Together with Remarks Presented in Eulogy of James Couzens, Late a Senator from Michigan. 75th Cong., 1st sess., 1937. Washington, D.C.: Government Printing Office, 1938.

External links

 
 

1872 births
1936 deaths
Mayors of Detroit
Ford executives
People from Chatham-Kent
Republican Party United States senators from Michigan
Michigan Republicans
Burials at Woodlawn Cemetery (Detroit)
Canadian emigrants to the United States
Detroit Police Department chiefs